Ross Kemp in Search of Pirates is a documentary series presented by actor Ross Kemp on Sky 1. During filming Kemp was aboard the warship which was deployed to rescue Captain Phillips after his ship the Maersk Alabama was captured off the coast of Somalia by pirates.

External links

2009 British television series debuts
2009 British television series endings
Sky UK original programming
Television series by Endemol
Television series by Tiger Aspect Productions